Dame Un Beso may refer to:

 "Dame Un Beso" (Selena song), 1986
 "Dame Un Beso" (Menudo song), 1982